Loch-Say is a rural locality (a settlement) in Levichanskoye Rural Settlement, Kosinsky District, Perm Krai, Russia. The population was 100 as of 2010. There are 4 streets.

Geography 
Loch-Say is located 59 km east of Kosa (the district's administrative centre) by road. Selishche is the nearest rural locality.

References 

Rural localities in Kosinsky District